Antenna Group, formerly known as ANT1 Group, is a media company in Greece and currently the largest Greek media company. It was established on 2 August 1989 by Minos Kyriakou. Today, his son, Theodore Kyriakou, heads up a media empire whose operations include broadcasting, radio, publishing, digital, educational services, telecommunications and a record label. At the cornerstone of the company is ANT1 TV, one of the largest and most successful private television networks in Greece.

ANT1 Group has also expanded its operations abroad, launching international feeds of ANT1 TV for Greek audiences abroad. It now operates stations serving North America, Europe, Australia/Asia and a regional feed of ANT1 Cyprus.

History
On 2 August 1989, Antenna TV S.A. was established, which was the main unit of the group, after starting in 1988 with Antenna 97.1 and Antenna 97.5 in Thessaloniki (now Easy 97.2 and Easy 97.5 respectively) which stations were established and operate from different companies but belonging to the same entity.

At the end of that year, the group, through the aforementioned company, founded and launched the TV station of the same name, ANT1, one of Greece's first private networks and one of the highest rated for many years.

ANT1 Group expanded yet again, this time internationally launching ANT1 Satellite in 1993 and ANT1 Pacific in 1997. ANT1 Satellite was the first Greek network to broadcast to audiences in North America while ANT1 Pacific brought the 'best of' ANT1 TV to Australia and the pacific rim.

In subsequent years, ANT1 Group has expanded its business beyond the broadcasting world, including launching Audiotex (initially as a telecommunications company and now as a multimedia software development services company), Daphne Communications S.A. (publishing company), Heaven Music (recording label) and ANTEL (wireless transmission).

In March 2011, Dish Network renews multi-year contract with Antenna Group for Greek programming, includes future launch of Antenna Prime, featuring live soccer and classic Greek shows. The agreement ensures continued carriage of Greek-language channels in US.

On October 1, 2021, ANT1 Group acquired Sony Pictures Television's Central and Eastern European portfolio (22 channels and two on-demand services).

In early 2022, MBC Group Middle East invested €225 million in Antenna Greece through capital increase.

Operations

Broadcasting

Greece
ANT1
Makedonia TV

Cyprus
ANT1 Cyprus

Romania
AXN
AXN Black
AXN Spin
AXN White
Kiss TV
Magic TV
Rock TV

Hungary
AXN
Viasat 2
Viasat 3
Viasat 6
Viasat Film

Poland
AXN
AXN Black
AXN Spin
AXN White

Czech Republic and Slovakia
AXN
AXN Black
AXN White

Balkans
AXN
AXN Spin

International
ANT1 Europe
ANT1 Pacific
ANT1 Satellite

Defunct channels
ANT1 Prime (classic ANT1 programming service in North America)
B92 Info (24-hour news channel in Serbia and Montenegro)
Blue (music channel in North America and Australia)

Divested channels
Nova (Sold to Modern Times Group and later to Advance Media. Currently owned by United Group)
Planet TV Slovenia (First sold to Telekom Slovenije and later to TV2 Csoport. Formerly a joint venture with TS)
Planet 2
Planet Plus (was renamed Planet Eva)
Prva Srpska Televizija (Sold to Kopernikus Corporation)
B92
Prva Files
Prva Kick
Prva Life
Prva Max
Prva Plus
Prva World

Radio

Greece
Easy 97.2 FM (Athens)
Easy 97.5 FM (Thessaloniki)
Rythmos 94.9 FM (Athens)

Cyprus
ANT1 FM 102.7 & 103.7

Romania
Asha
Kiss FM
Magic FM
One Dance
Rock FM

Divested stations
Play Radio Serbia
Prvi Srpski Radio

Telecommunications
ANTEL (wireless transmission)
Audiotex (multimedia software development services)

Publishing
Daphne Communications S.A.

Music
314 Records
Heaven Music

Education
Antenna Media Lab
Antenna Screenwriting Academy

Antenna Digital Ventures
Antenna Digital Ventures is the investing arm of Antenna Group focusing on setting up digital start ups in the regions the group operates. Antenna Digital Ventures has launched three start-up companies, Pricefox with Samlino Group, Stargram and Jukebooks.

See also
ANT1
List of programs broadcast by ANT1

References

External links
Official Site 
Pricefox
Stargram
Jukebooks

ANT1 Group
Mass media companies of Greece
Mass media in Athens
Mass media companies established in 1989
Greek companies established in 1989